Vincenzo "Cencio" Mantovani (17 October 1941 – 21 October 1989) was an Italian cyclist.

Background

He competed as an amateur track racer in the team pursuit at the 1964 Olympics and at the world championships in 1964–1965, winning silver medals on all occasions. He then became a professional road racer, but with little success.

References

1941 births
1989 deaths
Italian male cyclists
Cyclists at the 1964 Summer Olympics
Olympic cyclists of Italy
Olympic silver medalists for Italy
Olympic medalists in cycling
Cyclists from the Province of Mantua
Medalists at the 1964 Summer Olympics
People from Castel d'Ario